Ernest Nettleton (7 January 1918 – 5 March 2005) was an English professional footballer who played as a winger in the Football League for York City, and played wartime football for Sheffield United and York.

References

1918 births
Footballers from Sheffield
2005 deaths
English footballers
Association football forwards
York City F.C. players
English Football League players
Sheffield United F.C. wartime guest players
York City F.C. wartime guest players